Francesco I Gonzaga (1366 – 7 March 1407) was ruler of Mantua from 1382 to 1407. He was also a condottiero.

Succeeding his father Ludovico II Gonzaga in 1382, he led a policy of balance between the nearby powers of the Visconti of Milan and Venice. In 1380, he married Agnese, daughter of Barnabò Visconti. When she was executed in 1391 under accusations of adultery, Francesco switched his allegiance to Venice, also to protect his land from the increasing power of Gian Galeazzo Visconti.

In 1393, he remarried, to Margherita Malatesta, who carried in the Gonzaga family the hereditary illness of osteomalacia, which appeared periodically in Mantua's rulers until the 16th century. Francesco had subsequently to defend his lands from Gian Galeazzo's assault, but the latter's death in 1402 solved the conflict.

His son by Margherita was Gianfrancesco I.

Francesco Gonzaga is remembered as the builder of the Castle of San Giorgio, the nucleus of Ducal Palace of Mantua, the Gothic façade of the city cathedral, the bell tower of the Basilica of Sant'Andrea, as well as the Sanctuary of Santa Maria delle Grazie at Curtatone.

Francesco Gonzaga is the one who use the earliest example of Homophonic Substitution cipher in 1401 for correspondence with one Simone de Crema.

References

1366 births
1407 deaths
Francesco 1
14th-century condottieri
Francesco 1
15th-century Italian nobility
Burials in the Cappella Gonzaga, San Francesco, Mantua